Langton Tinago (28 September 1949 – 17 July 2018) was a Zimbabwean professional super feather/light/light welter/welterweight boxer of the 1960s, 1970s and 1980s, who won the Zimbabwe lightweight title, Zimbabwe welterweight title, Commonwealth lightweight title, and Commonwealth super featherweight title, and was a challenger for the Commonwealth light welterweight title against Billy Famous, his professional fighting weight varied from , i.e. lightweight to , i.e. welterweight.

References

External links

Image - Langton Tinago

1949 births
2018 deaths
Light-welterweight boxers
Lightweight boxers
Sportspeople from Midlands Province
Rhodesian male boxers
Super-featherweight boxers
Welterweight boxers
Zimbabwean male boxers